Mathieu Burgaudeau (born 17 November 1998 in Noirmoutier-en-l'Île) is a French cyclist, who currently rides for UCI ProTeam . In August 2020, he was named in the startlist for the 2020 Tour de France.

Major results

2015
 1st  Mountains classification, Tour du Pays de Vaud
2016
 4th Kuurne–Brussels–Kuurne Juniors
 7th Overall Tour du Valromey
1st Stages 1 & 4
 7th Overall Aubel–Thimister–La Gleize
1st  Points classification
 8th Chrono des Nations Juniors
2017
 3rd Overall Tour de Gironde
1st  Young rider classification
2018
 3rd Ghent–Wevelgem U23
 10th Overall Le Triptyque des Monts et Châteaux
2019
 9th Road race, UCI Road World Under–23 Championships
2021
 3rd Coppa Sabatini
 3rd Boucles de l'Aulne
 7th Classic Loire Atlantique
 8th Paris-Troyes
 8th Memorial Marco Pantani
2022
 1st Stage 6 Paris–Nice
 2nd Tour du Doubs
 5th Overall Étoile de Bessèges
 10th La Drôme Classic

Grand Tour general classification results timeline

References

External links

1998 births
Living people
French male cyclists
European Games competitors for France
Cyclists at the 2019 European Games
Sportspeople from Vendée
Cyclists from Pays de la Loire